Steve McQueen most often refers to:

 Steve McQueen (1930–1980), an American actor who appeared in 1960s and 1970s films
 Steve McQueen (director) (born 1969), a British film director, screenwriter and video artist

Steve McQueen may also refer to:

Music
 Steve McQueen (album), an album by Prefab Sprout
 "Steve McQueen" (M83 song), 2011
 "Steve McQueen" (Sheryl Crow song), 2002
 "Steve McQueen" (The Automatic song), 2008

People
 Steven R. McQueen (born 1988), actor Steve McQueen's grandson, an American actor

Fictional characters 
 Steve McQueen (House character), a rat character in the TV series House
 Stephen C. McQueen, the protagonist in "The Understudy", a novel by David Nicholls (writer)

Others
 The Steve McQueens, Singaporean band